Walter Pratt may refer to:
 Walter L. Pratt (1868–1934), American businessman and politician from New York
 Walter F. Pratt (born 1946), American law professor and administrator
 Babe Pratt (Walter Peter Pratt, 1916–1988), Canadian ice hockey player